The Gibraltar Futsal First Division is the top Gibraltarian futsal league organized by the Gibraltar Football Association (GFA). Since the 2013-14 season, the champion qualifies to enter the preliminary round of the UEFA Futsal Champions League.

Since 2014, the winner qualifies to play in the Louisito Bonavia Trophy (domestic supercup) against the winner of the Futsal Rock Cup (domestic futsal cup).

History 
The Gibraltar Scorpions won th 2013-14 season and became the first Gibraltar club to qualify for an international tournament. Since 2014-15 season, Lynx FC started a league domination where the club won five titles in five seasons. In 2018, the league re-organized from 4 divisions to two tiers, including the new 12 team First Division.

Futsal First Division 2021–22 season

Source:

List of champions

Titles by club

Scorers by season

See also 

 Gibraltar national futsal team
 Gibraltar Futsal Second Division

References

External links 

 Gibraltar FA official website.

Futsal in Gibraltar
Gibraltar